Mường Nhé is a rural commune (xã) of Mường Nhé District of Điện Biên Province, northwestern Vietnam. The commune is the capital of Mường Nhé District.

References

Populated places in Điện Biên province
District capitals in Vietnam